Anders Jacobsen (born 17 February 1985) is a Norwegian former ski jumper. He competed at the 2010 and 2014 Winter Olympics and won a team bronze medal in the large hill event in 2010. He is the youngest Norwegian winner of Four Hills Tournament.

Career

Early career
He made his debut in the Continental Cup on 11 January 2003, where he finished in the 50th position. In August the same year in a FIS Cup meeting in Rælingen, he placed 13th.

In 2006 he was picked for one of the eight spots in the Norwegian World Cup team. He made his debut in the Grand Prix season on 4 August, in Hinterzarten, where he finished 7th in the team competition (with Tom Hilde, Lars Bystøl and Roar Ljøkelsøy). On 5 August, he was eighth; on 14 August, in Courchevel, he was fourth; on 24 August, in Zakopane he was seventh; on 30 September, in Klingenthal, he was sixth; on 4 October, in Oberhof, he was tenth. He was tenth in the Grand Prix, with 184 points.

2006/07 season
After Daniel Forfang's  retirement he remained in the current Norwegian squad. He made his debut in the 2006/07 Ski jumping World Cup in Kuusamo on 24 November 2006, with a third place.

Jacobsen won four World Cup events that season, including the Innsbruck event on 4 January 2007 on his way to becoming overall winner of the 2006-07 Four Hills Tournament.

Entering the FIS Nordic World Ski Championships 2007 in Sapporo, Jacobsen led the overall Ski jumping World Cup standings. At those championships, he earned a silver medal in the team large hill. But he failed in the large hill competition, and finished 7th in the normal hill competition.

After the World Championships, Jacobsen has struggled to maintain his form. He failed to qualify for the finals in Lahti, finished tenth in Kuopio, and 14th in the first Holmenkollen competition. Adam Małysz won all those races and therefore he overtook the lead in the World cup standings.

2007/08 season
Not having his best season during 2007/2008, Jacobsen still won one world cup victory (being one of four Norwegian jumpers who each won a world cup victory that season), lead the Norwegian team to three team wins in the world cup and a team-bronze in the ski flying world championships, and placed sixth overall in the world cup, behind teammates Tom Hilde and Anders Bardal.

2008/09 season
As every Norwegian athlete, Jacobsen struggled to maintain the previous season's results in the 2008/2009 season, and had only one podium (3rd place in Trondheim early season) before entering the Four-Hills Tournament. There he showed growing shape, placing 6th overall. Before entering the World Championship, he placed second in the two last world cup races in Klingenthal and in the skiflying hill in Oberstdorf. The World Championship started dreadful for Jacobsen, falling from a bronze medal to 17th place after 86,5 m in the final round in the normal hill event. Yet again he placed third after the first round at the large hill event, winning the bronze medal after the race's cancellation. After winning a silver in the team large hill event Jacobsen won altogether two medals at the FIS Nordic World Ski Championships 2009 in Liberec. At the end of the season, he was eighth in the overall world cup standings.

2009/10 season
Jacobsen started the season with a fifth place in the opening race in Kuusamo, but then fell during training, and his placings dropped, mostly varying between top 20 and top 30. However, during the Four Hills Tournament, in the race in Garmisch-Partenkirchen Jacobsen struck back with a fifth place, falling from second place. He eventually won his sixth world cup victory in ski flying hill in Oberstdorf on January 31.

World Cup

Standings

Wins

Individual starts (164)

Trivia
He is the youngest Norwegian ski jumper in history to win the Four Hills Tournament (21 years old).
Prior to his professional career, Jacobsen worked as a plumber.

References

External links

1985 births
Living people
Norwegian Christians
Ski jumpers at the 2010 Winter Olympics
Ski jumpers at the 2014 Winter Olympics
Olympic ski jumpers of Norway
Olympic bronze medalists for Norway
Olympic medalists in ski jumping
FIS Nordic World Ski Championships medalists in ski jumping
Medalists at the 2010 Winter Olympics
People from Ringerike (municipality)
Sportspeople from Viken (county)